Guardian is an unincorporated community in Webster County, West Virginia, United States. Guardian had a post office, which closed on February 1, 1988. The community took its name from the local Guardian Coal and Oil Company. Guardian was previously known as Removal from about the 1880s until 1937 when the post office named changed to Guardian. Guardian was also referred to as Middleport in early postal records. The history of the town is exhaustively set out in a two volume book set (published in 2002 and 2015) known as "Removal Reflections: A History of Guardian/Removal, West Virginia."

References

Unincorporated communities in Webster County, West Virginia
Unincorporated communities in West Virginia